Sabirov or Sobirov is a masculine surname common in the Asian parts of the former Soviet Union, its feminine counterpart is Sabirova or Sobirova. It may refer to:
Farkhodbek Sobirov (born 1997), Uzbekistani weightlifter 
Karina Sabirova (born 1998), Russian handballer
Malika Sobirova (1942–1982), Tajik ballet dancer
Mukhammat Sabirov (1932–2015), Soviet and Russian engineer and politician
Oleg Sobirov (born 1981), Uzbekistani footballer
Parviz Sobirov (born 1980) is a Tajikistani judoka
Ravshanbek Sabirov, Kyrgyzstani politician
Rishod Sobirov (born 1986), Uzbekistani judoka
Shakhzodbek Sabirov (born 1993), Uzbekistani judoka
Shamil Sabirov (born 1959), Soviet boxer
Takhir Sabirov (1929–2002), Soviet film director, actor and screenwriter
Temur Sabirov (1940–1977), Tajikistani physicist and mathematician
Timur Sabirov (born 1986), Uzbekistani sports administrator
Zakir Sabirov (born 1951), Tajikistani artist

Tajik-language surnames
Uzbek-language surnames